The fifth season of Offspring, an Australian drama television series, premiered on Network TEN on 14 May 2014 and concluded on 6 August 2014.

Production 
Offspring was commissioned for a 13-episode fifth series on 12 July 2012 as part of a two-season renewal.

Filming for series five began on 21 October 2013 and concluded on 19 February 2014.

Series five of Offspring picks up six months after Patrick's death and revolves around the journey of Nina Proudman as she navigates through single parenthood with the help of sister Billie, the bringing up of her daughter Zoe and her determination to jump back into work.

Cast

Main 
 Asher Keddie as Nina Proudman
 Kat Stewart as Billie Proudman
 Matthew Le Nevez as Patrick Reid
 Richard Davies as Jimmy Proudman
 Jane Harber as Zara Perkich-Proudman
 Patrick Brammall as Leo Taylor
 Ido Drent as Lawrence Pethbridge
 Linda Cropper as Geraldine Proudman
 Deborah Mailman as Cherie Butterfield
 Ben Barrington as Thomas Buchdahl
 Eddie Perfect as Mick Holland
Lachy Hulme as Martin Clegg

Recurring 
 Alicia Gardiner as Kim Akerholt
 Lawrence Leung as Elvis Kwan
 Celia Pacquola as Ange Navarro

Guest 
 Mia & Willow Sindle, Isabella Monaghan and Zara Mclellan as Zoe Proudman-Reid
 Ben & Sam Hunter, Teah Whalan and Cleo Mete as Alfie Proudman
 Jude Mace and Indianna Lee as Paddy Proudman
 Cate Wolfe as Jess
 Maude Davey as Dr Nadine Samir
 David Roberts as Phil D'Arabont
 Kate Jenkinson as Kate Reid

Special guest 
 Garry McDonald as Phillip Noonan
 John Waters as Darcy Proudman
 Clare Bowditch as Rosanna Harding

Notes

Casting 
Kate Jenkinson, who recurred as Kate Reid, had to be written out of the season due to her ABC series Super Fun Night being picked up the states. It was announced Matthew Le Nevez will  star in series five, despite his character, Patrick dying in the penultimate episode of series four. Le Nevez is still credited as main cast.

Episodes

Ratings 

Figures are OzTAM Data for the 5 City Metro areas.
Overnight - Live broadcast and recordings viewed the same night.
Consolidated - Live broadcast and recordings viewed within the following seven days.

References

2014 Australian television seasons